The General Secretary of the Communist Refoundation Party is the chairman of the Communist Refoundation Party, a far-left political party in Italy.

List

Timeline

 
Communist Refoundation Party